The Miaoli County Government is the local government of the Republic of China that governs Miaoli County.

History
The county government used to be housed in a building next to the current building which is now used as the Miaoli County Urban Planning Exhibition Center.

Organization
 County Executive
 Deputy County Executive
 County Administration Meeting
 Secretary-General
 Executive Officer or Secretary

Departments
 Civil Affairs Department
 Finance Department
 Water Resources and City Development Department
 Public Works Department
 Education Department
 Labor Affairs and Social Resources Department
 Agriculture Department
 Land Administration Department
 Economic Development Department
 Indigenous Affairs Department
 General Affairs Department
 Planning Department
 Accounting and Statistics Department
 Personnel Department
 Civil Service Ethics Department

Bureaus
 Police Bureau
 Fire Bureau
 Public Health Bureau
 International Culture and Tourism Bureau
 Local Tax Bureau
 Environmental Protection Bureau

See also
 Miaoli County Council

References

External links

 

Miaoli County
Local governments of the Republic of China